Taking on Tyson is a television show on Animal Planet. The show stars the American boxer Mike Tyson competing in pigeon racing. Animal rights critiques criticized the series as being "animal cruelty."

References

External links
 Trailer on YouTube
 
 

Animal Planet original programming
2011 American television series debuts
2011 American television series endings
Mike Tyson